Charles Walter "Bobby" Messenger (March 19, 1884 – July 10, 1951) was a professional baseball player. 

Messenger was born in Bangor, Maine and was a 1908 graduate of Bates College where he played for the Bates team. After graduation he was a professional outfielder for parts of four seasons (1909–11, 1914) with the Chicago White Sox and St. Louis Browns.  For his career, he compiled a .172 batting average in 157 at-bats, with four runs batted in.

He died in Bath, Maine at the age of 67.

External links

1884 births
1951 deaths
Sportspeople from Bangor, Maine
Chicago White Sox players
St. Louis Browns players
Major League Baseball outfielders
Baseball players from Maine
Fall River Indians players
Birmingham Barons players
Rochester Hustlers players
Little Rock Travelers players
Toronto Maple Leafs (International League) players
Chattanooga Lookouts players
Great Falls Electrics players
New London Planters players
Pittsfield Hillies players
Bates College alumni